San Matteo in Via Merulana was a titular church in Rome, dedicated to the Apostle and Evangelist Matthew, for cardinal priests (the intermediary class).

History 
San Matteo was first established as a titular church in 112 by Pope Alexander I, then suppressed in 600 by Pope Gregory I. (No incumbents known for that period).
 
It was revived in 1517 by Pope Leo X. The church was crumbling by 1775 and the title was not awarded between 1776 and 1801, when it was finally suppressed and transferred to Santa Maria della Vittoria.
 
The church once housed the famed Marian icon of Our Mother of Perpetual Help, now under the custody of the Redemptorist Order, later supplemented with another Marian image.

List of titular Cardinal-priests 
(medieval names also unavailable)

 Andrea Corsini (1769.09.11 – 1776.07.15), Promoted Cardinal-Bishop of Sabina
 Alberico Archinto (May 24, 1756 – September 20, 1756), Appointed Cardinal-Priest of San Lorenzo in Damaso
 Luigi Mattei (December 10, 1753 – April 5, 1756), Appointed Cardinal-Priest of Santa Maria in Ara Coeli
 Fortunato Tamburini, Benedictine Order (O.S.B.) (September 23, 1743 – April 9, 1753), Appointed Cardinal-Priest of San Callisto
 Vincenzo Bichi (August 29, 1740 – May 20, 1743), Appointed Cardinal-Priest of San Silvestro in Capite
 Giambattista Altieri Jr. (November 20, 1724 – January 26, 1739), Promoted Cardinal-Bishop of Palestrina
 Nicola Grimaldi (June 8, 1716 – October 25, 1717)
 Francesco Nerli (iuniore) (September 25, 1673 – November 17, 1704), Appointed Cardinal-Priest of San Lorenzo in Lucina
 Francesco Maria Mancini (May 14, 1670 – June 29, 1672)
 Francesco Sacrati (May 17, 1621 – September 6, 1623)
 Francesco Sforza (November 13, 1617 – March 5, 1618), Promoted Cardinal-Bishop of Albano
 Roberto Ubaldini (April 3, 1617 – July 3, 1617), Appointed Cardinal-Priest of Santa Pudenziana
 Antonio Zapata y Cisneros (June 20, 1605 – June 5, 1606), Appointed Cardinal-Priest of Santa Croce in Gerusalemme
 Roberto Bellarmino, Jesuits S.J. (June 1, 1605 – August 31, 1621), Appointed Cardinal-Priest of Santa Prassede
 Giovanni Delfino (November 24, 1604 – June 1, 1605), Appointed Cardinal-Priest of San Marco
 Giovanni Evangelista Pallotta (January 15, 1588 – June 16, 1603), Appointed Cardinal-Priest of San Lorenzo in Lucina
 Decio Azzolini (seniore) (January 15, 1586 – October 9, 1587)
 Jérôme Souchier, Cistercians (O. Cist.) (January 24, 1569 – November 10, 1571)
 Gianbernardino Scotti, C.R. (January 13, 1556 – December 11, 1568)
 Girolamo Dandini (December 4, 1551 – October 25, 1555), Appointed Cardinal-Priest of San Marcello (al Corso)
 Bartolomé de la Cueva y Toledo (May 5, 1546 – December 4, 1551), Appointed Cardinal-Priest of San Bartolomeo all'Isola
 Charles de Hémard de Denonville (January 15, 1537 – August 23, 1540)
 Giles of Viterbo, Order of St. Augustine (O.E.S.A.) (July 10, 1517 – May 9, 1530), Appointed Cardinal-Priest of San Marcello (al Corso)
 Cristoforo Numai, Franciscans (O.F.M. Obs.) (July 6, 1517 – July 10, 1517), Cardinal-Priest of Santa Maria in Ara Coeli

Sources and external links
 CatholicHierarchy
 GCatholic, with incumbent biography links

Matteo